Iotrochotidae is a family of sponges belonging to the order Poecilosclerida.

Genera:
 Amphiastrella Dendy, 1896
 Hymetrochota Topsent, 1904
 Iotroata Laubenfels, 1936
 Iotrochopsamma Laubenfels, 1954
 Iotrochota Ridley, 1884
 Rotuloplocamia Lévi, 1952

References

Poecilosclerida
Sponge families